Anatoliy Reneiskiy is a Belarusian sprint canoeist who competed in the late 1990s. He won two medals in the C-4 200 m event at the ICF Canoe Sprint World Championships with a gold in 1997 and a silver in 1998.

References

Belarusian male canoeists
Living people
Year of birth missing (living people)
ICF Canoe Sprint World Championships medalists in Canadian